Pine Mountain, is a prominent peak in the Taconic Mountains of western Massachusetts. The mountain is located in Pittsfield State Forest and is traversed by the Pine Mountain Trail, which connects to the  Taconic Crest hiking trail and the  multi-use Taconic Skyline Trail.

The summit and west side of Pine Mountain are located within Hancock, Massachusetts; the east side is within Pittsfield, Massachusetts. Pine Mountain shares the summit ridge with Tower Mountain to the west; Smith Mountain is located south along the ridgeline, and Berry Mountain to the north.  Tilden Swamp, a highland bog, is located just below the summit to the northwest. The mountain drains into Hawthorne Brook, Parker Brook, and Onota Lake, thence to the Housatonic River and Long Island Sound.

References
 Massachusetts Trail Guide (2004). Boston: Appalachian Mountain Club.
 Commonwealth Connections proposal PDF download. Retrieved March 2, 2008.
 AMC Massachusetts and Rhode Island Trail Guide (1989). Boston: Appalachian Mountain Club.
 "Greenways and Trails" Massachusetts DCR. Retrieved February 22, 2008.

External links
 Pittsfield State Forest map
 Pittsfield State Forest. Massachusetts DCR.

Mountains of Berkshire County, Massachusetts
Taconic Mountains